Ivo Milazzo (born 20 June 1947) is an Italian comic book artist.

Born in Tortona, Milazzo worked mainly for Sergio Bonelli Editore. He debuted in 1971, drawing some Tarzan stories for the French market. Together with his friend, writer Giancarlo Berardi,  he created a number of characters, including in 1974 Ken Parker, one of the most appreciated western characters of European comics.

His style is somewhat reminiscent of that of Hugo Pratt.

References

External links

Page at lambiek.com

Italian comics artists
1947 births
Living people
People from Tortona